Rene Komar (born 6 November 1977 in Croatia) is a Croatian retired footballer.

Club career

DPMM FC
Komar played two seasons in Malaysia from 2005 to 2007 with DPMM FC, under fellow Croatian Ranko Buketa. His club gained promotion to the Malaysia Super League in his first season there.

After a season back home, Komar became part of the Brunei DPMM squad for the 2009 Singapore S.League season. He scored one goal that year, in a 2–0 victory over Balestier Khalsa. He also earned the man-of-the-match award for his good defensive performances on one occasion, in a 1-1 draw with Tampines Rovers.

Later that season, Komar was handed a 15-month ban by the Football Association of Singapore for displaying recalcitrance to the referee in a game against Home United by hitting him in the back.

References 

1977 births
Living people
Association football defenders
Croatian footballers
NK Pomorac 1921 players
DPMM FC players
NK Crikvenica players
NK Krk players
Singapore Premier League players
Malaysia Super League players
Croatian expatriate footballers
Expatriate footballers in Brunei
Croatian expatriate sportspeople in Brunei